Stenoma adustella is a moth of the family Depressariidae. It is found in Venezuela.

Adults are very pale cinereous fawn colour, with the wings rather broad, the forewings rounded at the tips, with a broad blackish band which contains several longitudinal streaks of the ground hue, and is much dilated towards the interior border, and has an irregular outline. There are few blackish submarginal points forming a line which is retracted to the band near the costa.

References

Moths described in 1864
Stenoma
Taxa named by Francis Walker (entomologist)